The Great Plains Aircraft Easy Eagle is a single seat homebuilt biplane, powered by a Volkswagen air-cooled engine.

Design and development
The Grosso Aircraft Easy Eagle 1 was designed by Ron Grosso, and the production rights were sold to Great Plains Aircraft Supply Company.

The Easy Eagle 1 is built with a steel tube fuselage that is fabric covered.
The wings are all wooden construction. It uses the same one piece, all-aluminum landing gear as the Monnett Sonerai.

The Easy Eagle is built from plans; there is no kit available, although Great Plains supplies some sub-assemblies. The estimated time to complete the aircraft from the plans is 300-500 hours.

Variants
Grosso Aircraft Easy Eagle 2
Two seat version

Specifications (Easy Eagle)

References

External links

1990s United States sport aircraft
Homebuilt aircraft